Otter Township is a township in Cowley County, Kansas, USA.  As of the 2000 census, its population was 54.

Geography
According to the USGS, it contains one cemetery, Cedar Creek.

The streams of Jim Creek, Little Beaver Creek, North Cedar Creek, Shafer Creek and South Cedar Creek run through this township.

References
 USGS Geographic Names Information System (GNIS)

External links
 City-Data.com

Townships in Cowley County, Kansas
Townships in Kansas